Baybay (IPA: [baɪ'baɪ]), officially the City of Baybay, is a 1st class component city in the province of Leyte, Philippines. It has a population of 111,848 people.

Formerly, Baybay was the biggest town in Leyte in terms of population and second in terms of land area, after Abuyog. The Baybay language, a Visayan language distinct from both Waray and Cebuano, is spoken in the city itself.

Baybay houses a major port on the central west coast of Leyte, where ferries leave for and from Cebu and other islands. It has also the Baybay Public Terminal, serving routes from Tacloban, Ormoc, Maasin, Manila, Davao City, and other towns in Leyte, Southern Leyte, and Samar.

Generally an agricultural city, the common means of livelihood are farming and fishing. Some are engaged in hunting and in forestall activities. The most common crops grown are rice, corn, abaca, root crops, fruits, and vegetables. Various cottage industries can also be found in Baybay such as bamboo and rattan craft, ceramics, dress-making, fiber craft, food preservation, mat weaving, metal craft, and Philippine furniture manufacturing and other related activities.

It is the home of the Visayas State University, one of the leading schools in Southeast Asia on agricultural research, and was called as "Resort University."

History

Baybay was believed to be the only settlement on the western coast of Leyte known to the first Spanish conquistadors that came with Magellan, as was Abuyog in the eastern part of the province, and Limasawa and Cabalian in the south. In 1620, the Jesuit fathers which belonged to the "residencia" of Carigara, the first and central station of the Society of Jesus in Leyte.

By superior approbation, Baybay was created a parish on September 8, 1835, with the invocation of Our Lady of the Immaculate Conception. However, the town was erected and independent parish on February 27, 1836.

When the Augustinians took over the administration of the parish after the expulsion of the Jesuits, they opened the first school in Baybay. During their time, the first road leading to Palompon was constructed, thus bringing Baybay closer to her neighboring municipalities. The Augustinian fathers stayed in the town for 75 years - all of which they devoted to the upliftment of the natives in education and in their economic standing.

The first church of Baybay was built in Barrio Punta where it still stands today but is in need of repair. Punta is one of the seven original barrios of Baybay and was even believed to be the original site of Baybay itself, although there are others who say that it was actually in Kabkab, in the vicinity of Barrio Pangasugan.

Chinese invaders attempted to conquer the community, but the brave and staunch natives foiled several attempts. When the Spanish conquistadors spread themselves out to the provinces, an expeditionary force under Felipe Segundo, evidently looking for a bigger settlement, landed in a barrio north of the town which was and still is called Pangasugan. Landing near the river, he pointed to a spot and asked a native in Spanish for the name of the place. Unable to understand Spanish and thinking that Felipe Segundo wanted to ask about the river, he answered in Visayan, " Ang suba nagbaybay sa Pangasugan." This is how Baybay got its name.

Baybay also suffered from Moro raids. On October 22, 1605, one such raid occurred and the pirates, after leaving countless dead, carried off 60 men as captives. Again, on November 4, 1663, moors under the dreaded Corralat took their toll of human lives and captives after mercilessly slaughtering the handful of men who defended the town with the aid of the parish priest.

Baybay suffered a great setback in 1866 when a great fire practically reduced the town to ashes leaving only the chapel of the Holy Cross in a miraculous manner.

The civil administration of the town during the Spanish era was placed in the hands of the gobernadorcillo, assisted by a teniente and the different jueces and cabezas. In 1892, in accordance with the provisions of the Mayura law, the head of the municipal government was given the designation of "Capitan Municipal" and his assistants in office were called "teniente mayor indice" and the "teniente de policia." For the first time, a juez de paz was designated and a detachment of guardias civiles was placed in the town.

The construction of the church, which still stands today, was begun under the engineering administration of Mariano Vasnillio during the term of Fr. Vicente E. Coronado in 1852. The construction lagged for ten years after which the work was resumed under Maestro Proceso, who came from Manila for the purpose of finishing the work. The church was finally finished in 1870 after Capitan Mateo Espinoso, a sculptor and painter of renown, put on the finishing touches. The altar and the rails as they stand today are a credit to his genius.

As the Spanish residents moved away in the early months of 1898, the reins of local government passed completely into the hands of the Filipino officials. An election was held and Don Quirimon Alkuino was elected as the first Filipino presidente. However, after about four months, Gen. Vicente Lukban nullified the results of the election and ordered another one to be held, with the same results. Lukban ordered that the barrios of Baybay be named after the tenientes, thus Caridad was renamed "Veloso," Plaridel became "Alvarado," Bitanhuan was named "Coronado." San Agustin "Sabando," Punta "Virgineza," Pomponan "Montefolka," Gabas "Bartolini", etc.

Throughout these years, Baybay developed into one of the biggest towns in Leyte.

The port of Baybay was closed in 1899 by the American coast guards. The price of commodities soared and products like copra and hemp accumulated in the docks. The order was lifted, but only after 14 ships, the greatest number to dock in port at one time, had stayed in port for days waiting for the order to leave.

On February 10, 1901, the first Americans arrived in Baybay on the ship "Melliza", their arrival caused great confusion and the people evacuated to the barrios. Only a few officials stayed in the town. The next day, soldiers scoured the countryside convincing the people to return to their homes.

Even while the local government was under Don Quirimon Alkuino, he was under orders to follow Capt. Gilmore's (commander of the American attachment) advice. Eventually, this caused conflicts in the local government, and Filipinos took to the hills to join the fight against the Americans.

There were several attempts to attack the American garrison in the town, but practically all of them failed because the Americans had superior arms. Don Guilermo Alkuino and Don Magdaleno Fernandez led the first attack with more than 200 men. The American soldiers fought another in Barrio Pomponan that resulted in the death of 30 men and the destruction of the barrio.

A group of Hilongosnons under the renowned Francisco Flordelis made an attempt in 1901 but they were driven off in a battle at Barrio Punta.

Filipino nationalist made Baybay one of the areas where they made their last stand against the Americans. Later, the surrender ceremonies were held in the town, but only after numerous conferences between American officers and Filipino pacifists were held to effect the surrender of the resistance leaders. The surrender of Capt. Florentino Penaranda who was the last to give up the fight was a colorful one. All his men and officers, thousands of them, gathered at the banks of the Pagbanganan River. From there, they marched to the plaza in front of the municipal hall where the American officers were waiting. Before the Filipinos laid down their arms, Penaranda delivered a speech that even today is considered one of the most stirring addresses made in the province. To commemorate the event, a sumptuous banquet was held for the Americans and the Filipino nationalists. The following day, the Filipino soldiers trekked home in their uniforms to start another life of peace and work.

A sect of the Protestant religion entered Baybay for the first time sometime in 1900. They established their own church in the poblacion. In 1902, the Philippine Independent Church established itself in the barrio of Caridad; shortly afterwards, the Seventh Day Adventists came in.

At the turn of the century, a provincial high school was founded in Baybay, one of the first high schools in Leyte. The government also established the Baybay National Agricultural School for young farmers of Visayas and Mindanao.

The Japanese forces came to Baybay in two waves in 1942. A puppet government was established shortly after their arrival wherein Paterno Tan Sr. was the mayor.

In 1944, American planes passed the town in bombing missions in Cebu. They bombed a ship at anchor in the port of Baybay and left it in flames. The Japanese Imperial Forces left the town on October 19, 1944.

Baybay was used by liberation forces as a springboard for patrol units in the south and for forces that went north for the great battle of Ormoc, where a fierce battle was raging. The hospital was taken over by the provincial government and is still functioning today.

Cityhood

On June 16, 2007, Baybay becomes a city in the province of Leyte after ratification of Republic Act 9389.

The Supreme Court declared the cityhood law of Baybay and 15 other cities unconstitutional after a petition filed by the League of Cities of the Philippines in its ruling on November 18, 2008. On December 22, 2009, the cityhood law of Baybay and 15 other municipalities regain its status as cities again after the court reversed its ruling on November 18, 2008. On August 23, 2010, the court reinstated its ruling on November 18, 2008, causing Baybay and 15 cities to become regular municipalities. Finally, on February 15, 2011, Baybay becomes a city again including the 15 municipalities declaring that the conversion to cityhood met all legal requirements.

After six years of legal battle, in its board resolution, the League of Cities of the Philippines acknowledged and recognized the cityhood of Baybay and 15 other cities.

Geography 

Baybay is bounded by Camotes Sea to the west, Albuera to the north, Inopacan to the south, Burauen, La Paz and MacArthur to the northeast, Javier to the east, and Abuyog and Mahaplag to the southeast.

The climate is of Coronas Climate type IV, which is generally wet with no particularly discernible seasons. Its topography is generally mountainous in the eastern portion as it slopes down west towards the shore line. Generally an agricultural city, the common means of livelihood are farming and fishing. Some are engaged in hunting and in forestal activities. The most common crops grown are rice, corn, abaca, root crops, fruits, and vegetables. Various cottage industries can also be found in Baybay such as bamboo and rattan craft, ceramics, dress-making, fiber craft, food preservation, mat weaving, metal craft, furniture manufacture and other related activities.

Barangays
Baybay comprises 92 barangays, 23 of which are in the Poblacion, with one barangay jointly located. The remaining 68 are rural barangays.

Climate

Demographics

The people of Baybay, known as Baybayanons or Baybayanos (depending on the usage) which are Cebuano-speaking. Most of the people are Roman Catholic with almost 90% of the whole population.

Language
People of Baybay City are mostly Boholano-speaking and Cebuano-speaking Leyteños with some influences from the Waray-Waray language. Baybayanon is the language spoken by inhabitants of the original settlements of Baybay City before mass migration of Cebuanos and Boholanos into the area and widely recognized as predating the surrounding Cebuano communities. It is a more representative language reference name than the so-called "Utodnon" or "Waya-Waya" since it does not refer to a single barangay, but spoken in five barangays, namely Guadalupe (Utod), Gabas, Kilim, Patag and Pangasugan.

It is a living language given an ISO 639-3 language code bvy and has an approximate 10,000 speakers (2009 J. Lobel). It has been listed by Ethnologue as a dialect of Waray-Waray, however, it is distinct from Waray-Waray, and is not mutually intelligible with that language. Furthermore, Baybayanon speakers do not consider themselves or their language to be Waray-Waray. No published works have argued that Baybayanon is a dialect of Waray-Waray; in fact, published works (by Rufino, as well as Lobel's forthcoming dissertation) have specifically referred to this as a distinct or separate language. Other languages spoken by few in the city include English, which is used as a second languages, as well as Spanish and Hokkien Chinese, mainly spoken by the remaining people of mestizo and Chinese descent.

Economy

Local government

Executive power is vested in the mayor.  The Sangguniang Panlungsod or the city council has the legislative power to create city ordinances.  It is a unicameral body composed of ten elected councilors and certain numbers of ex officio and sectoral representatives.  It is presided by the vice mayor, the City Mayor and the elected city councilors are elected-at-large every three years. Also, the city has also Regional Trial Court Branch 14 and Municipal Trial Court in Cities whose both located at the city proper in front of the Baybay Legislative Building and Convention Center.

List of mayors

Culture

Baybay is a hub of business and industry for the western coast of Leyte, with a commercial service sector in the city that includes banks, virtual assistance centers, restaurants, cafes, night spots, sports centers, as well as retail and wholesale stores. The city's seaside promenade is the most visited, especially at night-time.

Festivals
 Binaybayon Festival - is the city's Festival, is celebrated every 27th day of December (the city fiesta) in honor of the Patroness of Baybay, Our Lady of Immaculate Conception for the blessings that she gave every year. It also depicts the rich history of Baybay and also, showing the main source of livelihood of most Baybayanons like fishing and farming.Binaybayon Festival is located in Baybay City, Leyte.Travelers know that the destination is a major part of planning a trip, experiencing and delving deeper into unfamiliar places, people, and culture are paramount.According to traditional accounts, fete traces its origins during the arrival of the Spanish colonizers in the late 1500s, when they asked a native about the name of the place. Thinking he was being asked about the nearby river and beach, the local replied “ang suba kaynunuk nagabaybay sa Santa Kudos” which literally means “the river is meandering through the village of Santa Cruz”.

The Spaniards were only able to pick up the word “baybay” thus they named the place as such.
Tigbawanon Festival - is celebrated at Barangay Plaridel every 2nd Saturday of January in honor of Sr. Santo Niño. Like other festivals in Baybay, it is also shows the history of Barangay Plaridel and its main source of livelihood which is farming and weaving.
 Halaran Festival - is celebrated at Barangay Santo Rosario every month of October in honor of the Holy Rosary. It is also depicts the history of Barangay Santo Rosario and also, it shows the main source of livelihood among residents in the place which is fishing, because the barangay itself is resided beside the seashore.
Sirong Festival - is celebrated at Barangay Pomponan every 13th day of June in honor of Saint Anthony of Padua. Like other festivals in Baybay, it also shows the history of Barangay Pomponan and its main source of livelihood which is farming.

Infrastructure

Transportation

Baybay City can be reached by different types of transportation:
 It is 5 hours from Cebu City, 6 hours from Mindanao, and 20 hours from Manila by passenger vessels.
 There is no airport in Baybay, but domestic flights serve Tacloban airport, which is about 3 hours by road.

Healthcare

 There are five Healthcares located at the city of Baybay.

Media

Radio stations

There are two radio stations operating in Baybay: Groove FM (DYBK 92.5 FM), located at P&Q Subdivision, Barangay Cogon, Baybay City, Leyte, owned by the 5th Congressman District Leyte, Jose Carlos Cari, and the Radyo Natin Baybay (DYSA 102.9 FM) located at Tres Martires Street, 6521 Baybay, Leyte, one of the radio stations owned by Radyo Natin Network.

Cable and satellite television

The Pioneer Cable Vision Incorporated or (PCVI) provides 51 channels in total. It has expanded its services in the towns of Inopacan, Hindang, Hilongos, Bato, and Matalom. Other subscribers prefer to use Cignal Digital TV, G Sat, and Sky Direct.

Education

The city is home to various colleges and universities in the country.

Tertiary education
 Visayas State University (Main Campus)
a zonal agricultural university in the Visayas and one of the country's largest universities in terms of land area. VSU is also one of the premier universities in Southeast Asia in agricultural research. VSU is the only university in the entire Visayas region recognized by the Department of Tourism as a tourist site for its resorts, convention facilities, and most of all its 180degree view of Mount Pangasugan and the Camotes Sea. The Philippine Department of Tourism recognises its diverse flora and fauna bounding the mainland and sea from side to side.
 Franciscan College of the Immaculate Conception
 Acedilla Technological Institute Foundation Inc.

Secondary

Public

 Banahao National High School
Baybay National High School
 Baybay City National Night High School
 Bitanhuan National High School
 Bunga National High School
 Caridad National High School
 Ciabu National High School
 Plaridel National High School
 Pomponan National High School
 Mailhi National High School
 Makinhas National High School
 Visayas State University Laboratory High School

Elementary

There are 71 elementary schools in the city, 3 are located in the poblacion and 68 in rural areas.

Pre-elementary

There are several pre-elementary schools, i.e. kindergartens, as well as day care centers in various barangays.

References

External links

 [ Philippine Standard Geographic Code]
Local Governance Performance Management System

 
Cities in Leyte (province)
Populated places established in 1620
1620 establishments in the Philippines
Component cities in the Philippines